The 1984 Transamerica Open, also known as the Pacific Coast Championships, was a men's tennis tournament played on indoor carpet courts at the Cow Palace in San Francisco, California in the United States. The event was part of the 1984 Volvo Grand Prix circuit. It was the 96th edition of the tournament and was held from September 17 through September 23, 1984. First-seeded John McEnroe won the singles title, his fourth at the event after 1978, 1979 and 1982, and earned $40,000 first-prize money. Defending champion Ivan Lendl withdrew before the tournament due to Davis Cup obligations.

Finals

Singles
 John McEnroe defeated  Brad Gilbert 6–4, 6–4
 It was McEnroe's 11th singles title of the year and the 57th of his career.

Doubles
 Peter Fleming /  John McEnroe defeated  Mike De Palmer /  Sammy Giammalva 6–3, 6–4

References

External links
 ITF tournament edition details

Transamerica Open
Pacific Coast International Open
Transamerica Open
Transamerica Open
Transamerica Open